The Akashat ambush was a well planned assault against an unarmed Syrian Army convoy defended by Iraqi soldiers that took place on 4 March 2013, as the group was travelling in the province of Anbar, next to the border with Syria. The Islamic State of Iraq claimed responsibility for the ambush on 11 March 2013.

Prelude
On 1 March 2013, according to the Syrian officer who was in charge of the Yaarubiyeh border crossing, north of the Iraqi border, reported a man identifying himself as the leader of one faction in the Islamist rebel coalition called him that day demanding that he and his men surrender. He refused and the poorly defended border outpost, which only had 70 soldiers despite being one of the three main ones along the Syrian–Iraqi border, came under intense attack resulting in the deaths of six of his men. He said this forced him and the remaining men to the Iraqi Rabiya border crossing.

The group of 64 were detained by Iraqi authorities and transported to Baghdad, where from there they were to be transported back to Syrian authorities in the al-Waleed border crossing, located in Iraq's Al Anbar Governorate.

Ambush
The incident took place on 4 March 2013, while the convoy was on its way to the al-Waleed Border Crossing post in the Nineveh province of western Iraq, located in the predominantly Sunni Anbar Province. The convoy was transporting the unarmed Syrian  soldiers in several buses to al-Waleed, where they would be transferred back to Syrian authorities.

While the convoy was on its way Islamic State of Iraq gunmen set up a well coordinated assault on the convoy with roadside bombs, automatic weapons, and rocket-propelled grenades. The gunmen attacked the convoy from two sides. Explosives were first detonated on Iraqi military escorts assigned to protect transport the lorries full of unarmed Syrian soldiers. A total of 51 Syrian soldiers died, while ten others were wounded. Thirteen Iraqi soldiers were also killed in the attack.

Perpetrators
The identity of the attackers was immediately unknown, but Iraqi officials initially blamed the Free Iraqi Army, who are predominantly Sunni and have connections to the rebel group of the Free Syrian Army. This incident also raised fears that Iraq could be drawn into the Syrian Civil War.

On 11 March 2013, the Islamic State of Iraq claimed responsibility for the attack in an online statement, stating that they had set ambushes on roads to the Syrian border and had "annihilated" the convoy. The statement referred to the convoy as a "column of the Safavid army," a reference to the Shia Persian dynasty that ruled Iran from 1501 to 1736. The group also claimed that the presence of Syrian soldiers in Iraq showed "firm co-operation" between the Syrian and Iraqi governments.

References

Military operations of the Syrian civil war in 2013
Military operations of the War in Iraq (2013–2017) involving the Islamic State of Iraq and the Levant
Military operations of the Syrian civil war involving the Islamic State of Iraq and the Levant
Iraq–Syria border
Spillover of the Syrian civil war
Ambushes
March 2013 events in Syria
Mass murder in 2013
March 2013 events in Iraq